Charles Ruas is an American author, translator, literary and art critic, and interviewer. He lives and works in New York City.

Background
Born in Tianjin, China, Ruas was a graduate of Princeton University (BA 1960, MA 1963, PhD 1970) and was a Fulbright Scholar at the Sorbonne (1963–64). He is a specialist in French, English, and Comparative Literature, which he has taught at universities in the United States, France, and China.

Ruas was for a time in the late 1970s Director of the Drama and Literature Department of WBAI, where he initiated separate coverage of all the arts. Within this programming Susan Howe produced her own series and specials on poetry. Other programming initiated by Ruas at WBAI included the Audio-Experimental Theatre, for which multi-media performers, including poets, playwrights, video artists, and dancers were invited to create a work for radio broadcast. Performers included Meredith Monk, Vito Acconci, John Cage, Philip Glass, Joan Jonas, Yvonne Rainer, Ed Bowes, Robert Wilson, Richard Foreman, and Helen Adam.

Ruas also produced The Reading Experiment, a year-long series of readings from Marguerite Young's novel Miss MacIntosh, My Darling. The programs were scored by Rob Wynne with a collage of music and concrete sound effects. The readers came from a wide variety of artistic backgrounds and included Anaïs Nin, Marian Seldes, Oceola Archer, Novella Nelson, Leo Lerman, Owen Dodson, Wyatt Cooper, Anne Fremantle, and Ruth Ford, among others.

He has also produced arts and literature programming for PS1., Art on Air, and Clocktower.  A literary critic for the SoHo Weekly News until 1982, Ruas interviewed artists and writers for broadcast and print, including Toni Morrison, Michel Foucault, Carlos Fuentes, Eudora Welty, Susan Sontag, Truman Capote, Buckminster Fuller, Andy Warhol, Wyatt Cooper, Maxine Hong Kingston, and others. As a critic Ruas has been a frequent contributor to ARTnews and Art in America.

For his work in furthering literature and the arts and for his translation from the French, in 2012 Ruas was named Chevalier (Knight) of the Order of Arts and Letters by the government of France.

In 1992 Ruas returned to his birthplace, Tianjin, as a Visiting Fulbright Professor of American Literature and Civilization at Nankai University. In 2019, for its centennial celebration, the university awarded him the College of Foreign Languages Distinguished Professor Medal.

Ruas currently lives and works in New York City.

Works

The Intellectual Development of the Duc de Saint Simon - Charles Ruas. Princeton University, 1970. 
Conversations with American Writers – Charles Ruas. Knopf, 1985, 
Death and the Labyrinth  – Michel Foucault. John Ashbery (Introduction),  Charles Ruas (Translator). Doubleday, 1986,  / Continuum, 2007, 
An Artful Life: The Biography of D.H. Kahnweiler – Pierre Assouline. Charles Ruas (Translator). Grove/Atlantic, 1990, 
Harp Song for a Radical: The Life and Times of Eugene Victor Debs – Marguerite Young. Charles Ruas Editor. Knopf, 2009, 
Vera Gran: The Accused - Agata Tuszynska. Charles Ruas (Translator). Knopf, 2013, 
Portrait of a Family in Fear - Agata Tuszynska. Charles Ruas (Translator). Knopf, 2016, 
"New Directions: An Interview with James Laughlin," with Susan Howe; "The Struggle Against Censorship: with Maurice Girodias, William Burroughs, Allen Ginsberg, Carl Solomon, and James Grauerholtz." In The Art of Literary Publishing: Editors and Their Craft, edited by Bill Henderson. Pushcart Press, 1980, 
Marguerite Young,  Interview, The Paris Review #71, New York, 1977.
"Carlos Fuentes: An Interview," with Alfred MacAdam. Writers at Work, Sixth Series, edited by George Plimpton. The Viking Press, 1984, 
Marguerite Young, Our Darling : Tributes and Essays, Edited by Miriam Fuchs, Dalkey Archive Press, 1994. 
Grace: An American Woman in China, 1934–1974 – Eleanor McCallie Cooper, William Liu. Charles Ruas (Introduction). Soho Press, 2003, 
Hergé: The Man Who Created Tintin—Pierre Assouline. Charles Ruas (Translator) Oxford University Press, 2009, 
"China's Other Cultural Revolution: History and Chinese Art." Art in America, 9/1/98.

Filmography
 Ed Bowes, Director. Better, Stronger (1978). Video Feature Film, Walsung Productions.
 Ed Bowes, Director. How to Fly (1980). Video Feature Film, Walsung Productions. 
 Ed Bowes, Director. Spitting Glass (1989). Video Feature Film, Walsung Productions.

References

External links
 Conversations With Writers, PS1
 Clocktower
 Historic Audio from the Archives of Charles Ruas
 The Writers Room New York City
 PEN American Center
 Charles Ruas Papers and Audio Archives, Princeton University Firestone Library
 Charles Ruas Papers, U Penn
 Charles Ruas Archives - The Allen Ginsberg Project
 Charles Ruas Interviews, Columbia University
 The Queens Public Library Memory Project : The United Nations Community
East Asian Library Princeton University The Ruas China Archives 1860-1946

1938 births
Living people
Princeton University alumni
University of Paris alumni
American art critics
Literary critics of English
Literary critics of French